The Agape International Spiritual Center is a transdenominational congregation currently holding Sunday services at the Saban Theatre in Beverly Hills, California, founded in 1986 by Michael Bernard Beckwith.  Agape International Spiritual Center is the flagship location of the Agape Movement founded by Beckwith, an international New Thought belief community founded in the tradition of Religious Science, that has expanded into a trans-denominational international community, with members, spiritual practitioners, ministers and ministries across the globe, international live-streaming services, and its affiliate congregation, Agape East Spiritual Center, in Norfolk, Virginia, and Agape Bay Area in Oakland, CA

See also 
 Religious Science

References

External links 
 Agape International Spiritual Center
 Agape East Spiritual Center, An Agape International Affiliate

New Thought churches
Religion in California
Churches in California
Religious Science
Christian organizations established in 1986
1986 establishments in California